The Memorial to the Confederate Dead is a Confederate memorial in Missouri.

Around 1899, the Ladies’ Confederate Monument Association began raising funds to erect a monument in St. Louis to soldiers who had fought against the United States. After some $23,000 ($ today) was raised, mostly from the United Daughters of the Confederacy, the monument was installed in Forest Park, the city's largest park. It was dedicated on December 4, 1914.

It was rededicated in 1964 on its 50th anniversary.

In 2015, St. Louis Mayor Francis Slay launched an effort to have the monument removed. He appointed a committee of business and civic interests, which later that year recommended its removal.

in June 2017, the monument was removed from Forest Park, one of at least 36 Confederate memorials removed that year from locations around the country.

As of 2022, it awaits a new home outside St. Louis City and County limits, per an agreement between the city and Missouri Civil War Museum in Jefferson Barracks.

See also

 List of Confederate monuments and memorials
 Removal of Confederate monuments and memorials

References

Confederate States of America monuments and memorials in Missouri
Outdoor sculptures in Missouri
Relocated buildings and structures in Missouri